Robyn Moore may refer to:

Robyn Moore (Australian actress, born 1950), Australian actress in Dot Films and Blinky Bill; see List of Blinky Bill characters
Robyn Moore (Australian actress) (born 1971), Australian actress
Robyn Moore (British actress) (born 1960), British actress

See also
Robin Moore (1925–2008), writer